The Mushroom (also known as The Murderer Strikes at Dawn, The Killer Strikes at Dawn and L’assassin frappe à l’aube) is a 1970 French-Italian crime film written and directed by Marc Simenon.

Plot 
A physician, growing distant from his workaholic wife, befriends an artist. After a night spent drinking and taking hallucinogenic mushroom with the artist, the physician discovers that his wife had died, and begins to question what took place.

Cast 

 Mylène Demongeot as Anne Calder
 Alida Valli as Linda Benson
 Jean-Claude Bouillon as Éric Calder
 Catherine Allégret as Jeannette
 Philippe Monnet as Gaëtan
 Jean Claudio as Kogan
 Georges Géret as Kurt
 François Simon as Le Juge

References

External links

1970 films
1970 crime films
French crime films
Italian crime films
Films directed by Marc Simenon
1970s French films
1970s Italian films